Manura Kuranage Lanka Perera (born 11 February 1979) is a Sri Lankan former sprinter. He competed in the men's 4 × 400 metres relay at the 2000 Summer Olympics.

References

External links
 

1979 births
Living people
Athletes (track and field) at the 2000 Summer Olympics
Sri Lankan male sprinters
Olympic athletes of Sri Lanka
Place of birth missing (living people)